This is a list of bestselling novels in the United States in the 2020s, as determined by Publishers Weekly. The list features the most popular novels of each year from 2020 through to 2029.

2020
 Midnight Sun by Stephenie Meyer
 Dog Man: Grime and Punishment by Dav Pilkey
 The Ballad of Songbirds and Snakes by Suzanne Collins
 Where the Crawdads Sing by Delia Owens
 Diary of a Wimpy Kid: The Deep End by Jeff Kinney
 The Boy, the Mole, the Fox and the Horse by Charlie Mackesy
 The Very Hungry Caterpillar by Eric Carle
 Dog Man: Fetch-22 by Dav Pilkey
 Little Fires Everywhere by Celeste Ng
 If Animals Kissed Good Night by Ann Whitford Paul

2021
 Dog Man: Mothering Heights by Dav Pilkey
 Diary of a Wimpy Kid: Big Shot by Jeff Kinney
 The Boy, the Mole, the Fox and the Horse by Charlie Mackesy
 It Ends with Us by Colleen Hoover
 The Very Hungry Caterpillar by Eric Carle
 Oh, the Places You'll Go! by Dr. Seuss
 The Four Winds by Kristin Hannah
 They Both Die at the End by Adam Silvera
 The Song of Achilles by Madeline Miller
 The Midnight Library by Matt Haig

2022
 It Ends with Us by Colleen Hoover
 Verity by Colleen Hoover
 It Starts with Us by Colleen Hoover
 Where the Crawdads Sing by Delia Owens
 Ugly Love by Colleen Hoover
 The Seven Husbands of Evelyn Hugo by Taylor Jenkins Reid
 Reminders of Him by Colleen Hoover
 November 9 by Colleen Hoover
 Diary of a Wimpy Kid: Diper Överlöde by Jeff Kinney
 The Very Hungry Caterpillar by Eric Carle

2023

References

Publishers Weekly bestselling novels series
Novels
Novels
2020s books